Marta Bühler (born 6 February 1951) is a Liechtensteiner former alpine skier who competed in the 1968 Winter Olympics and in the 1972 Winter Olympics. She was the first woman to represent Liechtenstein at the Olympics.

References

External links
 

1951 births
Living people
Liechtenstein female alpine skiers
Olympic alpine skiers of Liechtenstein
Alpine skiers at the 1968 Winter Olympics
Alpine skiers at the 1972 Winter Olympics